Teichospora is a genus of fungi in the family Teichosporaceae.

References

Pleosporales